Olgoi-Khorkhoi could refer to:
 Olgoi-Khorkhoi, a local name for the cryptid Mongolian Death Worm.
 Olgoi-Khorkhoi, a short story by Ivan Yefremov.